The 1974 Grantland Rice Bowl was an NCAA Division II game following the 1974 season, between the Delaware Fightin' Blue Hens and the UNLV Rebels. This was the first time that the game was played at Tiger Stadium on the campus of LSU. Delaware running back Vern Roberts was named the game's outstanding offensive player, while his teammate defensive back Mike Ebersol was named the game's outstanding defensive player.

Notable participants
UNLV running back Mike Thomas and wide receiver Steve Haggerty were selected in the 1975 NFL Draft, while guard Joe Ingersoll was selected in the 1976 NFL Draft. Quarterback Glenn Carano, tight end Reggie Haynes, and tackle Blanchard Carter were selected in the 1977 NFL Draft. Thomas, Ingersoll, Carano, and wide receiver Mike Haverty are inductees of the UNLV athletic hall of fame. Head coach Ron Meyer would later lead the New England Patriots and the Indianapolis Colts.

Delaware running back Nate Beasley was selected in the 1976 NFL Draft. Beasley and head coach Tubby Raymond  are inductees of the Delaware athletics hall of fame. Raymond is an inductee of the College Football Hall of Fame, and the field at Delaware Stadium is named in his honor.

Scoring summary

References

Grantland Rice Bowl
Grantland Rice Bowl
Delaware Fightin' Blue Hens football bowl games
UNLV Rebels football bowl games
Grantland Rice
Grantland Rice Bowl